Aplatissa michaelis is a species of moth of the family Hepialidae. It is endemic to Brazil.

References

External links
Hepialidae genera

Moths described in 1914
Hepialidae
Endemic fauna of Brazil
Moths of South America